Spegazzinia is also a synonym of the cactus genus Rebutia.

Spegazzinia is a genus of mitosporic Ascomycota in the Apiosporaceae family. The widely distributed genus contains seven species. This genus is somewhat related to other lobed or ornamented genera such as Candelabrum. No information is available regarding health effects or toxicity. Allergenicity has not been studied. Spegazzinia is usually identified on spore trap samples where it is seen every few weeks (spores have very distinctive morphology). It may also be found in air by culturable (Andersen) samples if a long enough incubation period is provided so that sporulation occurs. Laboratories have never found this organism growing on indoor environmental surfaces. Natural habitat includes soil and many kinds of trees and plants.

The genus was circumscribed by Pier Andrea Saccardo in Rev. Mycol. (Toulouse) vol.2 on page 140 in 1880.

The genus name of Spegazzinia is in honour of Carlo Luigi Spegazzini, (in Spanish Carlos Luis Spegazzini) (1858–1926), who was an Italian-born Argentinian botanist and mycologist.

Species
As accepted by Species Fungorum;
 Spegazzinia affinis 
 Spegazzinia bromeliacearum 
 Spegazzinia camelliae 
 Spegazzinia cruciata 
 Spegazzinia deightonii 
 Spegazzinia flabellata 
 Spegazzinia intermedia 
 Spegazzinia lobulata 
 Spegazzinia neosundara 
 Spegazzinia parkeri 
 Spegazzinia radermacherae 
 Spegazzinia subramanianii 
 Spegazzinia sundara 
 Spegazzinia tessarthra {{Au|(Berk. & M.A. Curtis) Sacc. (1886)
 Spegazzinia xanthorrhoeae 

Former species;
 S. lobata  = Sporidesmium lobatum, Pleosporomycetidae family
 S. ornata  = Spegazzinia tessarthra
 S. tessarthra var. deightonii  = Spegazzinia deightonii
 S. trichophila  = Isthmospora trichophila, Microthyriaceae family

References

Taxa named by Pier Andrea Saccardo